Warrior is a brand of athletic shoe from China, founded in Shanghai in 1927. From the 60s to the early 80s it became a nationwide shoemaker in China.

Background
In the mid 80s, foreign brands became more popular, and Warrior is often seen as a working class shoe. Nowadays, various companies have started importing them to the west, and they are sold along with Feiyue shoes in fashionable areas of Chinese cities.

Parent
Warrior is owned by Shanghai Huayi, a chemical company. There are also Warrior brand tires, made in a joint venture with Michelin.

References

External links
Official Website
Reps Sneakers
FashionReps Shoes
Chinese brands
Chinese footwear
Shoe companies of China
Manufacturing companies based in Shanghai